Dhisana is one of the Hindu goddess of prosperity in Hinduism. She appears sometimes in the hymns in most of the mandala in Rig Veda one of the vedas. She had also been mentioned as the goddess of fire, sun, moon & stars.

As per the other Hindu texts dhisana name also referred to various other things such as soma vessel, knowledge, intelligence, speech. In the rig veda it is referred as the goddess of abundance and the guardian of the sacred fire.

Few of the Indologists had also noted dhisana in their study & discussions, two of them were German named Alfred Hillebrandt and Richard Pischel.

One another noted Dhisana as the two worlds, heaven and earth. While A. Hillebrandt has noted dhisana mainly as earth and their closely associated group of three named as earth, atmosphere and heaven. A few other Hindu texts noted dhisana as dual planks over which the activity of soma took place.

R. Pischel has noted Dhisana a goddess of wealth similar to Aditi and the earth. The goddess had been mentioned in the following below mandala and hymns in the rig veda.

References

External links 
 RIGVEDA in Hindi

Hindu goddesses
Solar goddesses
Fire goddesses
Lunar goddesses